Stephen Clement may refer to:

 Stephen Emmett Clement (1867–1947), politician in Manitoba, Canada
 Stephen Clement (Manitoba sheriff) (1831–1901), his father, political figure in Manitoba
 Stephen Merrell Clement (1859–1913), American banker, businessman and industrialist in Buffalo, New York